Jai Ram Verma  (4 February 1904 – 14 January 1987) was an Indian freedom fighter, politician and was Member of parliament, Lok Sabha of India. He was a member of the 7th Lok Sabha and was also a member of the Uttar Pradesh Legislative Assembly. Verma represented the Faizabad constituency of Uttar Pradesh and was a member of the Indian National Congress political party.

Early life and education
Jai Ram Verma was born in the village Baragaon Brahimpur, Faizabad in the state of Uttar Pradesh. He attended the Government Inter College in the city of Faizabad and his highest educational qualification is intermediate. Verma worked as a teacher and agriculturist prior to joining politics. He did his M.Sc in Mathematics from Allahabad University.

Political career

Pre independence
Varma participated in the Indian independence movement. He was arrested several times (Apr 1941, Aug 1942 & Feb 1945). He participated in the Satyagraha and Quit India Movements. Jai Ram Varma served as a member of Uttar Pradesh Legislative Assembly from 1946 (pre independence) and then went on to be appointed in the first Vidhan Sabha of Uttar Pradesh.

Post independence
Jai Ram Varma has been in active politics since early 1930s. He joined Congress party. Whilst with Congress, he became a member Uttar Pradesh Legislative Assembly for several terms. He quit the Congress party to join newly formed Bharatiya Kranti Dal in 1967. During his association with Bharatiya Kranti Dal, he again was elected as a member of Uttar Pradesh Legislative Assembly.
In 1975, Varma quit Bharatiya Kranti Dal to join Congress (I) once again.
Varma held several key party posts and was also a Minister & Deputy Minister in the Government of Uttar Pradesh.

Posts held

See also

7th Lok Sabha
Lok Sabha
Politics of India
Parliament of India
Government of India
Indian National Congress
Faizabad (Lok Sabha constituency)
Uttar Pradesh Legislative Assembly
List of Indian independence activists

References

India MPs 1980–1984
1904 births
Indian National Congress politicians from Uttar Pradesh
Lok Sabha members from Uttar Pradesh
People from Faizabad
People from Faizabad district
1987 deaths
Members of the Uttar Pradesh Legislative Assembly
Indian independence activists from Uttar Pradesh